Trinchesia granosa is a species of sea slug, an aeolid nudibranch, a marine gastropod mollusc in the family Trinchesiidae.

Distribution
This species was described from the Gulf of Naples, Italy. It has been recorded on the coasts of the Mediterranean Sea from Italy to south-west France.

References

 Gofas, S.; Le Renard, J.; Bouchet, P. (2001). Mollusca. in: Costello, M.J. et al. (eds), European Register of Marine Species: a check-list of the marine species in Europe and a bibliography of guides to their identification. Patrimoines Naturels. 50: 180-213

Trinchesiidae
Gastropods described in 1966